Caton's Chapel is an unincorporated community in Sevier County, Tennessee, United States.  It is accessible via State Route 454 (Birds Creek Road) and Catons Chapel Road, near State Route 416 (Pittman Center Road).  Dolly Parton was raised and attended elementary school in Caton's Chapel.  It is referred to by some natives (the few that remain) as "The Chapel".

Geography
Caton has a mean elevation of 1,109 feet (338 metres).

References 

Unincorporated communities in Sevier County, Tennessee
Unincorporated communities in Tennessee